Joel Hamling (born 9 April 1993) is a professional Australian rules footballer playing for the Fremantle Football Club in the Australian Football League (AFL). Hamling previously played for the Western Bulldogs from 2015 to 2016.

AFL career

He was born in Denmark, Western Australia, but was brought up in Broome. After playing colts for Claremont in the WAFL, he was recruited by the Geelong Football Club with pick 32 in the 2011 national draft. After three years with Geelong without playing a senior match, he joined the Western Bulldogs as a delisted free agent at the end of the 2014 season. Hamling made his debut in round 9, 2015, against  at Etihad Stadium. Hamling was apart of the Western Bulldogs premiership team in 2016. Following the 2016 AFL season he returned home to Western Australia when he was traded to the Fremantle Football Club.

Hamling missed the entire 2020 season due to an ankle injury. Hamling only played one game during the 2021 season after he re-injured the same ankle in round one against Melbourne and had to undergo ankle surgery in July 2021. Hamling made his return in round 2 of the 2022 AFL season during Fremantle's clash against St Kilda.

Statistics
 Statistics are correct to the end of round 10, 2022

|- style="background-color: #EAEAEA"
! scope="row" style="text-align:center" | 2015
|
| 30 || 11 || 0 || 0 || 64 || 47 || 111 || 53 || 15 || 0.0 || 0.0 || 5.8 || 4.3 || 10.1 || 4.8 || 1.4 || 0
|-
! scope="row" style="text-align:center" | 2016
|
| 30 || 12 || 0 || 0 || 67 || 59 || 126 || 43 || 16 || 0.0 || 0.0 || 5.6 || 4.9 || 10.5 || 3.6 || 1.3 || 0
|- style="background-color: #EAEAEA"
! scope="row" style="text-align:center" | 2017
|
| 21 || 22 || 0 || 0 || 126 || 142 || 268 || 110 || 42 || 0.0 || 0.0 || 5.7 || 6.5 || 12.2 || 5.0 || 1.9 || 0
|-
! scope="row" style="text-align:center" | 2018
|
| 21 || 18 || 0 || 0 || 129 || 114 || 243 || 106 || 21 || 0.0 || 0.0 || 7.2 || 6.3 || 13.5 || 5.9 || 1.2 || 2
|- style="background-color: #EAEAEA"
! scope="row" style="text-align:center" | 2019
|
| 21 || 22 || 0 || 0 || 137 || 97 || 234 || 111 || 25 || 0.0 || 0.0 || 6.2 || 4.4 || 10.6 || 5.0 || 1.1 || 0
|-
! scope="row" style="text-align:center" | 2020
|
| 21 || 0 || – || – || – || – || – || – || – || – || – || – || – || – || – || – || –
|- style="background-color: #EAEAEA"
! scope="row" style="text-align:center" | 2021
|
| 21 || 1 || 0 || 0 || 3 || 7 || 10 || 0 || 1 || 0.0 || 0.0 || 3.0 || 7.0 || 10.0 || 0.0 || 1.0 || 0
|-
! scope="row" style="text-align:center" | 2022
|
| 21 || 1 || 0 || 0 || 6 || 4 || 10 || 4 || 0 || 0.0 || 0.0 || 6.0 || 4.0 || 10.0 || 4.0 || 0.0 || TBA
|- class="sortbottom"
! colspan=3| Career
! 87
! 0
! 0
! 532
! 470
! 1002
! 427
! 120
! 0.0
! 0.0
! 6.1
! 5.4
! 11.5
! 4.9
! 1.4
! 2
|}

Notes

References

External links

1993 births
Living people
Australian rules footballers from Western Australia
Western Bulldogs players
Western Bulldogs Premiership players
Claremont Football Club players
Indigenous Australian players of Australian rules football
Fremantle Football Club players
People from Denmark, Western Australia
People from Broome, Western Australia
One-time VFL/AFL Premiership players
Peel Thunder Football Club players